Jivaro (also known as Lost Treasure of the Amazon) is a 1954 American 3-D Technicolor adventure film directed by Edward Ludwig and starring Fernando Lamas, Rhonda Fleming and Brian Keith. Publicity material for the film translates Jivaro as "headhunters of the Amazon". Originally filmed in 3-D, due to a decline in interest Jivaro was not presented in that format in its original release. It later had its 3-D debut on September 17, 2006 at The World 3-D Expo in Hollywood.

Plot
Alice Parker (Fleming) arrives at the Brazilian trading outpost of Rio Galdez (Lamas) in search of her fiancé (Denning), an alcoholic engineer who has ventured into dangerous Jívaro territory on a quest for gold.

Cast

Fernando Lamas as Rio Galdez
Rhonda Fleming as Alice Parker
Brian Keith as Tony
Lon Chaney Jr. as Pedro Martines
Richard Denning as Jerry Russell
Rita Moreno as Maroa
Marvin Miller as Jivaro Chief Kovanti
Morgan Farley as Vinny
Pascual García Peña as Sylvester, Rio's aide
Nestor Paiva as Jacques
Kay Johnson as Umari
Charles Lung as The Padre
Gregg Barton as Edwards

Production
In April 1952, Pine-Thomas Productions announced they had bought the novel Morro Treasure by David Duncan and hired Duncan to write the script.

The film was known as Lost Treasure of the Amazon.  In August John Payne was announced as star as part of a two-picture contract with Pine Thomas, the other being High Voltage. Payne ended up not appearing in the film and High Voltage was never made.

Rhonda Fleming and Fernando Lamas were cast in April 1953. The film was meant to be in 3-D.

References

External links
 
 
 

1954 3D films
American adventure films
1954 films
1954 adventure films
Films set in Brazil
Films set in South America
1950s English-language films
American 3D films
Films with screenplays by David Duncan (writer)
Paramount Pictures films
Films directed by Edward Ludwig
1950s American films